The following is a timeline of the history of the city of Verona in the Veneto region of Italy.

Prior to 18th century

 2nd century BCE - Ponte Pietra (Verona) (bridge) and Via Postumia (road) built.
 49 BCE - Verona becomes a Roman municipium.
 1st century CE - Verona Arena and Via Claudia Augusta (road) built.
 4th-5th century - Roman Catholic Diocese of Verona active (approximate date).
 312 - Battle of Verona (312); Constantinian forces win.
 362 - Zeno of Verona becomes bishop (approximate date).
 489 - Battle of Verona (489); Ostrogoths win.
 556 - Forces of Narses of the Byzantine Empire take Verona (approximate date).
 568 - Lombards in power.
 589 - October: Alleged flood.
 774 - Verona taken by forces of Charlemagne.
 1065 - San Fermo Maggiore church construction begins (approximate date).
 1117 - 1117 Verona earthquake.
 1185 - Papal election, 1185 held at Verona.
 1187 - Verona Cathedral consecrated by Pope Urban III.
 1260 - Mastino I della Scala becomes capitano del popolo of Verona; Scaligeri rule begins.
 1290 - Sant'Anastasia church construction begins.
 1354 - Castelvecchio Bridge built.
 1363 -  built on the Piazza dei Signori (approximate date).
 1370 -  remodelled (approximate date).
 1375 - Castelvecchio (castle) built.
 1380 - Public clock installed (approximate date).
 1387 - Scaligeri rule ends.
 1393 -  rebuilt.
 1398 - Basilica of San Zeno rebuilt.
 1405 - Venetian forces take Verona; city pledges devotion to Venice.
 1470 - Printing press in operation.
 1471 - Sant'Anastasia church consecrated.
 1493 -  built on the Piazza dei Signori.
 1543 - Accademia Filarmonica di Verona (music academy) founded.
 1555 -  founded.
 1560 - Palazzo Canossa built.
 1585 - Teatro Olimpico (theatre) opens.
 1610 -  construction begins.
 1630 - Plague.

18th-19th centuries
 1732 - Teatro Filarmonico (theatre) opens.
 1738 -  (museum) established.
 1757 - Flood.
 1782 - Societa Italiana delle Scienze formed.
 1792 -  (library) founded.
 1796 - Verona occupied by French forces during the French Revolutionary Wars.
 1797 - April: Uprising against French occupiers.
 1801
 City divided into French area and Austrian area, per Treaty of Lunéville.
 Castel San Pietro dismantled.
 1805 - French in power.
 1814 - February: Verona taken by Austrian forces.
 1815 - Verona becomes part of the Kingdom of Lombardy–Venetia of the Austrian Empire per Congress of Vienna; period of  begins.
 1822 - 20 October: International diplomatic congress held in Verona at the close of the Napoleonic Wars.
 1825 - Cassa di Risparmio di Verona, Vicenza, Belluno e Ancona (bank) established.
 1829 -  (cemetery) designed.
 1833 -  (fortification) construction begins.
 1847 - Verona Porta Vescovo railway station opens.
 1848
 6 May: Battle of Santa Lucia fought near city.
 Palazzo Barbieri built.
 1851 - Verona Porta Nuova railway station built.
 1852 -  (bridge) built.
 1866
 October: Verona becomes part of the Kingdom of Italy per Treaty of Vienna (1866).
 18 November: King of Italy Victory Emmanuel visits city.
 L'Arena newspaper begins publication.
 1867
 Banca Popolare di Verona (bank) founded
  becomes mayor.
 1881 -  (railway) begins operating.
 1882 - September: .
 1887 -  built.
 1888 - Fedrigoni paper mill in business.
 1897 - Population: 72,860.
 1898 -  begins.

20th century

 1903 - Hellas Verona F.C. (football club) formed.
 1911 - Population: 81,909.
 1913 - Arena di Verona Festival begins.
 1919 - 2 August: 1919 Verona Caproni Ca.48 crash.
 1921 - Virtus Verona football club formed.
 1931 -  (bridge) built.
 1941 - Archivio di Stato di Verona (state archives) established.
 1943 - November: National congress of the Republican Fascist Party held in Verona.
 1944 - January: Trial and execution of anti-Mussolini leaders takes place in Verona.
 1945 - Bombing of Verona in World War II.
 1948 -  (theatre festival) begins.
 1963 - Stadio Marc'Antonio Bentegodi (stadium) opens.
 1975 -  begins broadcasting.
 1978 -  built.
 1982 - University of Verona founded.
 1990 - Some of the 1990 FIFA World Cup football contest played in Verona.
 1998 - National conference of Alleanza Nazionale political party held in Verona.

21st century

 2007 -   held; Flavio Tosi becomes mayor.
 2013 - Population: 253,409.

See also
 History of Verona
 List of mayors of Verona
 List of bishops of Verona
 List of Scaligeri lords of Verona, 1260-1404
 Timeline of the Republic of Venice, of which Verona was part 1405-1796
 Veneto history (it) (region)

Timelines of other cities in the macroregion of Northeast Italy:(it)
 Emilia-Romagna region: Timeline of Bologna; Ferrara; Forlì; Modena; Parma; Piacenza; Ravenna; Reggio Emilia; Rimini
 Friuli-Venezia Giulia region: Timeline of Trieste
 Trentino-South Tyrol region: Timeline of Trento
 Veneto region: Timeline of Padua; Treviso; Venice; Vicenza

References

This article incorporates information from the Italian Wikipedia.

Bibliography

in English
 
 
 
 
 
 
 
 
 
 . + (1870 ed.)

in Italian

 
  1745-1749
 
 
  (bibliography)
 
  1960-

External links

  (city archives)
 Items related to Verona, various dates (via Europeana)
 Items related to Verona, various dates (via Digital Public Library of America)

 
Verona